Earl Robert Miller (born 1958) is an American diplomat who served as the United States ambassador to Bangladesh from 2018 to 2022. He previously served as U.S. Ambassador to Botswana from 2014 to 2018.

Education
Miller graduated from the University of Michigan with a Bachelor of Arts in 1981.

Career
Miller served as a United States Marine Corps officer where served on active duty until 1984 and in the reserves until 1992 where he took part in the Persian Gulf War. He joined the United States Department of State in 1987 where he initially worked as a desk officer in the agency's Southern Africa section. He then joined the Diplomatic Security Service as a special agent in Miami, San Francisco, and assistant regional security officer in El Salvador. In 1995, Miller became the regional security officer (RSO) for the U.S. embassy in Gaborone, Botswana. He served in this capacity in a number of countries including Malaysia, Indonesia, Iraq, and India. While posted in Malaysia, Miller took part in the investigation of an ambush in eastern Indonesia that saw two U.S. schoolteachers murdered. He was the Consul General of the United States to South Africa in Johannesburg from 2011 to 2014.

Starting December 18, 2014, Miller served as the United States Ambassador to Botswana. In January 2018, Miller was asked by  Botswana government officials if the State Department regarded Botswana as a "shithole" country after President Donald J. Trump was reported to have used that word to refer to African nations in a private meeting on immigration with lawmakers. Miller was awarded the Award for Heroism from the Diplomatic Security Service, the Shield of Bravery from the Federal Bureau of Investigation (FBI), and the Secretary's Distinguished Service Award from Secretary of State Antony Blinken on May 20, 2022. He is fluent in Indonesian, French, and Spanish.

In July 2018, Miller was nominated by President Donald Trump to be the next U.S. Ambassador to Bangladesh.

During the 2018 Bangladesh election violence he expressed his concern and played a crucial role in restoring peace and end violence. Miller left Bangladesh on January 21, 2022.

Personal life
Miller was previously married to Ana Miller, originally an El Salvadoran national. They have two sons, Alexander and Andrew. Miller speaks French, Spanish, and Indonesian.

See also

Bangladesh - United States relations

References

1958 births
Living people
21st-century American diplomats
Ambassadors of the United States to Bangladesh
Ambassadors of the United States to Botswana
United States Foreign Service personnel
United States Marine Corps officers
University of Michigan alumni